Lecithocera prudens is a moth in the family Lecithoceridae. It was described by Edward Meyrick in 1918. It is found on New Guinea.

The wingspan is about 20 mm. The forewings are rather dark purplish fuscous. The discal stigmata are well marked and dark fuscous. The hindwings are grey.

References

Moths described in 1918
prudens